Mitridae, known as mitre shells, are a taxonomic family of sea snails, widely distributed marine gastropod molluscs in the clade Mitroidea.

Both the Latin name and the common name are taken from the item of ecclesiastical headgear, the mitre or miter, used in reference to the shape of the shells.

The dentition of radula in the Mitroidea is rachiglossate, with well-developed central and lateral teeth, both comb-like. Members of this family are predators.

Distribution
These sea snails are found in most warm and temperate seas.

Subfamilies and genera 
Subfamilies and genera in the family Mitridae include:

 Cylindromitrinae Cossmann, 1899
 Nebularia Swainson, 1840
 Pterygia Röding, 1798
 Imbricariinae Troschel, 1867
 Cancilla Swainson, 1840
 Imbricaria Schumacher, 1817
 Imbricariopsis Fedosov, Herrmann, Kantor & Bouchet, 2018
 Neocancilla Cernohorsky, 1970
 Scabricola Swainson, 1840
 Swainsonia H. Adams & A. Adams, 1853
 Isarinae Fedosov, Herrmann, Kantor & Bouchet, 2018
 Isara H. Adams & A. Adams, 1853
 Subcancilla Olsson & Harbison, 1953
 Mitrinae Swainson, 1829
 Acromargarita S.-I Huang, 2021
 Calcimitra Huang, 2011
 Cancillopsis Fedosov, Herrmann, Kantor & Bouchet, 2018
 † Dentimitra von Koenen, 1890 †
 Domiporta Cernohorsky, 1970
 Episcomitra Monterosato, 1917
 Eumitra Tate, 1889
 Fusidomiporta Fedosov, Herrmann, Kantor & Bouchet, 2018
 Gemmulimitra Fedosov, Herrmann, Kantor & Bouchet, 2018
 Mitra Röding, 1798
 Neotiara Fedosov, Herrmann, Kantor & Bouchet, 2018
 Profundimitra Fedosov, Herrmann, Kantor & Bouchet, 2018
 Pseudonebularia Fedosov, Herrmann, Kantor & Bouchet, 2018
 Quasimitra Fedosov, Herrmann, Kantor & Bouchet, 2018
 Roseomitra Fedosov, Herrmann, Kantor & Bouchet, 2018
 Ziba H. Adams & A. Adams, 1853
 Pleioptygmatinae Quinn, 1989
 Pleioptygma Conrad, 1863
 Strigatellinae Troschel, 1869
 Strigatella Swainson, 1840
 [unassigned] Mitridae (temporary name)
 Atrimitra Dall, 1918
 Carinomitra Fedosov, Herrmann, Kantor & Bouchet, 2018
 † Clifdenia Laws, 1932 
 Condylomitra Fedosov, Herrmann, Kantor & Bouchet, 2018
 Dibaphimitra Cernohorsky, 1970
 † Fusimitra Conrad, 1855
 Magnamitra Huang & Salisbury, 2017
 Probata Sarasúa, 1989
 Vicimitra Iredale, 1929

 Genera brought into synonymy
 Acuticylindra Iredale, 1929: synonym of Pterygia Röding, 1798
 Chrysame H. Adams & A. Adams, 1853: synonym of Strigatella Swainson, 1840
 Conoelix Swainson, 1821: synonym of Imbricaria Schumacher, 1817
 Cylindra Schumacher, 1817: synonym of Pterygia Röding, 1798
 Cylindromitra P. Fischer, 1884: synonym of Pterygia Röding, 1798
 †  Diplomitra Finlay, 1926: synonym of Eumitra Tate, 1889 
 Mauritia H. Adams, 1869: synonym of Nebularia Swainson, 1840
 Mitroidea Pease, 1865: synonym of Nebularia Swainson, 1840
 Mitrella Swainson, 1831: synonym of Swainsonia H. Adams & A. Adams, 1853
 Mutyca H. Adams & A. Adams, 1853: synonym of Nebularia Swainson, 1840
 Tiarella Swainson, 1840: synonym of Mitra Lamarck, 1798

References

External links 
 Swainson W. (1829-1833). Zoological Illustrations, or original figures and descriptions of new, rare, or interesting animals, selected chiefly from the classes of ornithology, entomology, and conchology, and arranged according to their apparent affinities. Second series. London: Baldwin & Cradock. (Vol. 1-3)
 Fedosov A., Puillandre N., Herrmann M., Kantor Yu., Oliverio M., Dgebuadze P., Modica M.V. & Bouchet P. (2018). The collapse of Mitra: molecular systematics and morphology of the Mitridae (Gastropoda: Neogastropoda). Zoological Journal of the Linnean Society. 1-85
 Miocene Gastropods and Biostratigraphy of the Kern River Area, California; United States Geological Survey Professional Paper 642